Ferenc Hámori (born 14 October 1972) is a former Hungarian footballer.

Honours
Hungarian League: 1*
  2000–01

References

1972 births
Living people
Hungarian footballers
Hungary international footballers
MTK Budapest FC players
Győri ETO FC players
C.S. Marítimo players
Vasas SC players
Maccabi Netanya F.C. players
Ferencvárosi TC footballers
Israeli Premier League players
Association football forwards
Hungarian expatriate footballers
Expatriate footballers in Portugal
Expatriate footballers in Israel
Hungarian expatriate sportspeople in Portugal
Hungarian expatriate sportspeople in Israel
Footballers from Budapest